The 1958 United States Senate election in West Virginia was held on November 4, 1958. Robert Byrd was elected Senator, and he held the seat until 2010, upon his death.

In 1956 Senator Harley M. Kilgore died, and former Senator Chapman Revercomb won his seat in the 1956 special election. The election was held alongside the 1958 midterms, where Republicans had a net loss nationally. Revercomb lost re-election to incumbent Representative Robert Byrd. West Virginia was one of the many states that were flipped from Republican to Democratic in the 1958 midterms, as Democrats also flipped the other Senate seat in the state in a special election. This would be the last time that Democrats simultaneously flipped both of a state's Senate seats until Georgia's elections in 2020 and 2021. This would be the Closest Race Of Byrds Senate career.

Results

References 

1958
West Virginia
United States Senate
Robert Byrd